or simply J3 is the third division of . It was established in 2013 as the third-tier professional association football league in Japan.

The third-tier nationwide league is a relatively recent development in Japanese football with a first attempt made in 1992 (second division of the old JFL), though it only lasted for two seasons. In 1999, following the establishment of J2 League, a new Japan Football League was created to comprise the third tier and lower divisions. After the introduction of J3, the JFL was demoted to the fourth-tier nationwide league, for the first time in history of Japanese football.

History of Japanese third-tier football

Amateur era (until 2013)
A national third tier of Japanese association football was first established along with its professionalization in 1992, when the newly created Japan Football League kicked off with two tiers below the professional J. League. Among the 10 original clubs of the third tier included the forerunners to Kyoto Sanga FC, Ventforet Kofu, Omiya Ardija, Avispa Fukuoka and Vissel Kobe (the latter two being located in different regions from their J. League successors). But after a number of clubs were lost for various reasons – some were promoted to J.League and the others folded – the league contracted the second division in 1994 and continued with the single second-tier division.

The third tier football was reintroduced in 1999 upon creation of fully professional J2. The old JFL was dissolved but a new Japan Football League was formed the same year in order to establish a nationwide top-tier amateur league. But despite its officially amateur status the league quickly became de facto semi-professional, serving as the cradle of the future J. League members. Since the establishment of associate membership system in 2006 the number of professional clubs holding or actively seeking for this status has grown steadily and reached its peak in 2013 season when 6 full members and 2 former candidates made up to almost half of the league's 18 teams. Through the course of the season this number grew even bigger, to 10 full associate members that formed the core of J3.

Professionalization and establishment (2013)
Close to the end of 2012 football season Japanese media began to spread rumors about the upcoming professional third-tier league, referred to as either "J3" or "J.Challenge League". Most of the sources agreed that the new league will feature around 10–12 clubs, most of which will be associate members. The league would also provide more relaxed licensing criteria in comparison to J2 – e.g. the stadium seating capacity of just 3,000 with no mandatory floodlighting.

After the discussion on J1-J2 Joint Committee on 16 January 2013, all J.League clubs agreed in principle with an establishment of the new league starting 2014. This decision was formally put into force by J.League Council in a 26 February executive meeting. The league was planned to launch with 10 teams, but another session of J.League Council in July decided that inaugural season of J3 will feature 12 teams.

To participate, a club must have held an associate membership, or have submitted an application before 30 June 2013, and then passed an inspection to obtain a participation licence issued by J.League Council. On 19 November, J.League confirmed the following clubs to participate in the inaugural J3 season:
 Gainare Tottori (relegated from 2013 J.League Division 2)
 Blaublitz Akita (JFL)
 Machida Zelvia (JFL)
 SC Sagamihara (JFL)
 Nagano Parceiro (JFL)
 Zweigen Kanazawa (JFL)
 YSCC Yokohama (JFL)
 FC Ryukyu (JFL)
 Fukushima United (JFL)
 Fujieda MYFC (JFL)
 Grulla Morioka (Tōhoku League, 2013 Tōhoku League Champion and Regional Promotion Series Champion)
 J.League U-22 team, composed of the best J1 and J2 youngsters to prepare them for the 2016 Olympics

Future plans
The league has not provided a clear expansion timeline yet but it was most likely that J3 continued to accommodate new teams after its inaugural season. The following is a list of clubs that may get promoted to J.League in the near future:
 Cobaltore Onagawa (Tohoku Soccer League) – J.League 100 Year Plan club status
 Criacao Shinjuku (JFL) – J.League 100 Year Plan club status
 Kochi United SC (JFL) – J.League 100 Year Plan club status and J3 license holders
 Nankatsu SC (KSL Division 1) – J.League 100 Year Plan club status
 Okinawa SV (JFL) – J.League 100 Year Plan club status
 ReinMeer Aomori (JFL) – J.League 100 Year Plan club status and J3 license holders
 Tochigi City (KSL Division 1) – J.League 100 Year Plan club status
 Tokyo 23 FC (KSL Division 1) – J.League 100 Year Plan club status
 Veertien Mie (JFL) – J.League 100 Year Plan club status and J3 license holders
 Verspah Oita (JFL) – J.League 100 Year Plan club status and J3 license holders
 Vonds Ichihara (KSL Division 1) – J.League 100 Year Plan club status

Other teams have applied for J.League associate membership but were denied. Most of these clubs continue to aim for J3 as their ultimate goal.
 MIO Biwako Shiga (JFL)

Three teams, one withdrew its J3 license, another its J.League 100 Year Plan status, formerly associate membership, and the third was deprived of both:
 Suzuka Point Getters (JFL)
 Tokyo Musashino City FC (JFL)
 Tonan Maebashi (KSL Division 1)

Some sources claim that J3 was intended to reach up to 60 clubs in the future, being split into three regionalized divisions running in parallel.

Timetable

Crest 

On 20 December 2022, the J3 League logo colour was changed to blue for the 2023 season prior to the 10th anniversary of Japan's third-tier professional league below J1 and J2, whose respective logo colours are red and green.

History crest

2023 season

League format 
For this season, the league is played in two rounds (home-and-away), each team playing a total of 38 matches.

Each team must have at least 3 players holding professional contracts. Also, from the 2016 season, 5 foreign players are allowed per team, plus 1 more from J.League's ASEAN partner country of or from other AFC countries. The matchday roster will consist of 18 players, and up to 3 substitutes will be allowed in a game.

Promotion and relegation 
Rules for promotion to J2 are largely similar to those of Japan Football League in recent seasons: to be promoted, a club must hold or be granted a J2 license and finish in top 2 of the league. From 2017 to 2023, the champions and the runners-up have been promoted directly and replace the 21st- and 22nd-placed J2 clubs. If only the champion or runner-up holds or is given a J2 license, only the bottom club of J2 is relegated; if both top 2 finishers are ineligible for promotion, then no teams will be promoted to or relegated from J2.

From the 2024 season, the 3rd to 6th placers will have promotion playoffs and the winner will also be the third team automatically promoted. The three J2 bottom-placed teams will be automatically relegated to J3.

At a J.League board meeting in August 2021, 60 clubs (of which 20 are J3) were targeted for the entire league, and a possibility that J3 will have exceeded 20 clubs by the 2023 season was brought up. Mitsuru Murai, the J.League chairman, revealed that he was discussing how to adjust to 20 clubs. At this time, he was asked, "If there is a possibility of the [J3] league having 21 teams, is it okay to understand that there are teams that will fall from J3 to JFL?" While under consideration, he admitted that the J3 and JFL were considering the introduction of relegation to the latter league as early as after the 2022 season. Later in November, Murai announced that promotion from and relegation to the JFL was planned after the 2023 season,

In early January 2023, the J.League introduced the J3–JFL promotion/relegation playoffs, enabling the possibility for teams to be relegated from the J3. The system of promotion and relegation between the J3 and the JFL can be determined by the eligibility (promotion to J3 requires a J.League license) of the JFL's champions and runners-up for the season.

If only the JFL champions hold a license, they replace automatically the J3's 20th-placed team.
If only the JFL runners-up hold a license, there are promotion/relegation playoffs with the J3's 20th-placed team.
If both the JFL champions and runners-up hold licenses, there will be automatic exchange between the JFL champions and the J3's 20th-placed team, and the runners-up compete in two-legged playoffs with the J3's 19th-placed team.
If both the JFL champions and runners-up do not hold licenses, no exchange takes place; the teams placed third and below in the league standings, even if one of them holds a J3 license, are not entitled to promotion and the playoffs.

Participating clubs (2023)

Pink background indicates clubs most recently promoted from JFL
Gray background indicates the club most recently relegated from J2
"Year joined" is the year the club joined the J. League (J3 League unless otherwise indicated).
"First season in D3," "Seasons in D3," and "Current spell in D3" include seasons in JFL

Stadiums (2023) 

Primary venues used in the J3 League:

Former clubs

Pink background indicates clubs most recently promoted to J2
"Year joined" is the year the club joined the J. League (J3 League unless otherwise indicated).
"First season in D3," "Seasons in D3," and "Current spell in D3" include seasons in JFL

Championship and promotion history

From 2014 to 2016, the playoff winners faced off against the 21st place in J2. From 2017 to 2023 season, the two club was promoted by default. From 2024 onwards, the third promotion place is determined by a playoff between the 3rd to 6th actual places.

* Bold designates the promoted club;† Lost the J2–J3 playoffs;‡ Won the J2–J3 playoffs and got promoted;

Most successful clubs
Clubs in bold compete in J3 as of 2023 season.

Relegation history
From 2023, relegation from J3 to JFL was introduced, after nine seasons of not featuring it.

* Bold designates relegated clubs† Won the playoff against JFL team‡ Lost the playoff series to JFL team and was relegated

Players and managers

Managers
 List of J.League managers

Top scorers

See also

 Sport in Japan
 Football in Japan
 Women's football in Japan
 Japan Football Association (JFA)

 Soccer/football
 League system
 Japanese association football league system
 J.League
 J1 League (Tier 1)
 J2 League (Tier 2)
 J3 League (Tier 3)
 Japan Football League (JFL) (Tier 4)
 Regional Champions League (Promotion playoffs to JFL)
 Regional Leagues (Tier 5/6)

 Domestic cup
 Fujifilm Super Cup (Super Cup)
 Emperor's Cup (National Cup)
 J.League YBC Levain Cup (League Cup)

 Futsal
 F.League
 F1 League (Tier 1)
 F2 League (Tier 2)
 JFA Futsal Championship (National Cup)
 F.League Ocean Cup (League Cup)

 Beach soccer
 Beach Soccer Championship (National Cup)

References

External links
 Official website, JLeague.jp 
 Official YouTube channel 

 
3
3
Summer association football leagues
Sports leagues established in 2013
2013 establishments in Japan
Third level football leagues in Asia
Professional sports leagues in Japan